Obersöchering is a municipality  in the Weilheim-Schongau district, in Bavaria, Germany.

References

Weilheim-Schongau